Mark Yeates is an Irish footballer.

Mark Yeates may also refer to:

Mark Yeates (Australian footballer), Australian rules footballer

See also
Mark Yates (disambiguation)